Lieutenant-General Sir Gerald De Courcy Morton   (7 February 1845 – 20 April 1906) was a British Army officer who became General Officer Commanding 7th Division.

Military career
Morton was commissioned into the 6th Regiment of Foot in 1863. He served in Hazara in 1868 and fought in the Second Anglo-Afghan War before being appointed Adjutant-General in India in 1895 and becoming General Officer Commanding Lahore District in 1898. 
In December 1898, he was made a Knights Commander of India (KCIE). In January 1902 he was appointed a Major-General on the Staff to command the Dublin district, and six months later, on 23 June 1902, he was appointed General Officer Commanding 7th Division. He died in command of his division at Curragh Camp in 1906.

References

1845 births
1906 deaths
British Army generals
British military personnel of the Second Anglo-Afghan War
Knights Commander of the Order of the Indian Empire
Commanders of the Royal Victorian Order
Companions of the Order of the Bath
Royal Warwickshire Fusiliers officers